SS De Grasse was an ocean liner built in 1921 by Cammell Laird, Birkenhead, United Kingdom for the Compagnie Generale Transatlantique, and launched in February 1924. In August 1924 The De Grasse set sail on her maiden voyage on the Le Havre to New York route. After the fall of France to Nazi Germany, the ship was use as a floating barracks ship. Sunk at Bordeaux, France, during the German retreat, she was refloated, repaired and put back into service. Over the years and shipowners, she became the Empress of Australia and then Venezuela. The vessel ran aground off Cannes, France, in 1962 and was scrapped at La Spezia, Italy.

History

CGT Line

Originally speculated ordered under the name Suffren, the ship was renamed after the Compagnie Générale Transatlantique (CGT) acquired the Brazilian ship SS Leopoldina. The De Grasse was put into service in August 1924 on the Le Havre to New York route. It was modernized in 1931.

At the start of World War II, it continued its crossings, but in a slightly militarized version (blocked portholes, light armament). In the spring of 1940, it was transformed into a troop transport. The ship was decommissioned in May 1940 at Bordeaux. It was then used as a floating barracks ship for German soldiers and then as a base ship for Italian submariners (Italy had based more than twenty submarines a Bordeaux to support the Germans during the Battle of the Atlantic). Appearing as too dangerous a target after the first British bombardment on Bordeaux, the ship surrendered to the Vichy government in May 1942, which used it as a training ship.

The Germans partially sank it during their retreat in August 1944. It was refloated in August 1945 and sent to the Penhoët shipyards to be repaired and modernized (it lost a funnel during these transformations). The ship was reassigned to the Le Havre to New York route while the CGT reconstituted a fleet.

Canadian Pacific

In 1953, De Grasse was sold to Canadian Pacific Steamships after the ship,  caught fire and capsized. De Grasse was renamed in that same year to Empress of Australia. However, she didn't serve Canadian Pacific for long as in 1956 the ship was sold to the Italian company Sicula Oceanica.

Sicula Oceanica
In 1956, the Empress of Australia was sold to Sicula Oceanica, and after a refit, the ship was renamed the Venezuela servicing the Naples to Caribbean route. She had an uneventful career with her new owner. In 1962, the Venezuela was wrecked off Cannes. She was refloated but was broken up at La Spezia, Italy in August of the same year.

Notable passengers
In 1949, Jacqueline Bouvier travelled aboard the SS De Grasse on a study abroad trip to Paris.

See also
 List of ocean liners

References

Further reading
 Haworth, R.B. Miramar Ship Index: ID #1185887.
 Tate, E. Mowbray. (1986). Transpacific Steam: The Story of Steam Navigation from the Pacific Coast of North America to the Far East and the Antipodes, 1867-1941. New York: Cornwall Books.  (cloth)

1924 ships
Ships built on the River Mersey
Ocean liners
Ships of CP Ships
Ships of the Compagnie Générale Transatlantique
Steamships of Canada
Steamships of France
Steamships of Italy
Maritime incidents in August 1944
Maritime incidents in 1962
Ocean liners of Canada